Maioli is an Italian surname. Notable people with the surname include:

Giordano Maioli (born 1943), Italian tennis player
Walter Maioli (born 1950), Italian archaeologist and musician

Italian-language surnames